The High Commissioner of the United Kingdom to Solomon Islands is the United Kingdom's foremost diplomatic representative to the Solomon Islands, and in charge of the UK's diplomatic mission in Solomon Islands.

The current British High Commissioner to Solomon Islands also is employed as the High Commissioner to the Republic of Nauru.

High Commissioners to the Solomon Islands

 1978–82    Gordon Slater
 1982–86    George Norman Stansfield
 1986–88    John Noss
 1988–90    Junor Young
 1990–95    Raymond Jones
 1996–98    Brian Connelly
 1998–2001  Alan Waters
 2001–04    Brian Baldwin
 2004–08    Richard Lyne
 2008–11    Timothy Smart
 2012–16    Dominic Meiklejohn, also non-resident British High Commissioner to Vanuatu and Nauru

2016–2019 David Ward, also non-resident British High Commissioner to Vanuatu and Nauru
2019–2022: Brian Jones, also to Nauru
2019–2022: Thomas Coward, also to Nauru

References

External links

UK and Solomon Islands, gov.uk

Solomon Islands
United Kingdom
High Commissioners
High Commissioners to Nauru
United Kingdom
United Kingdom
Nauru and the Commonwealth of Nations
Solomon Islands and the Commonwealth of Nations
United Kingdom and the Commonwealth of Nations
Vanuatu and the Commonwealth of Nations